Kim Si-a (born May 6, 2008), is a South Korean child actress. She had notable roles in Miss Baek (2018), Ashfall (2019), Kingdom: Ashin of the North (2021) and The Silent Sea (2021). She signed an exclusive contract with Mystic Entertainment, in 2019. She has a younger sister, Kim Bo-min, who is a child actress.

Filmography

Film

Television series

Awards and nominations

References 

Living people
2008 births
South Korean child actresses
South Korean television actresses
South Korean film actresses
21st-century South Korean actresses